Gordon McKee (born 12 October 1966) is an American former track and field athlete who competed in the long jump. He was the silver medallist in the event at the 1992 IAAF World Cup, finishing behind home favourite Iván Pedroso in Havana.

In his sole other major international outing he competed in the qualifying round only at the 1993 IAAF World Indoor Championships. He was the national champion in the long jump at the USA Indoor Track and Field Championships in 1990. Track & Field News ranked McKee 9th in the world twice - first in 1990 and again in 1992.

Born to Frank McKee and Barbara McKee, he grew up in Texas with his sister, Jan. He attended Rockdale High School in Texas and excelled in track while there. He was inducted into the school's Sports Hall of Honor in 2013. McKee, his wife and his two sons lost their house to flooding after  Hurricane Katrina in 2005.

International competitions

References

External links

Living people
1966 births
Track and field athletes from Texas
American male long jumpers